East Alton–Wood River High School is a public high school located in Wood River, Illinois, United States. The mascot is the Oilers which dates back to the time where the main employer was Standard Oil Company. The principal is Leigh Robinson, assisted by Mr. Gockel, and Dean / AD Mark Beatty. The Superintendent is Dr. John Pearson.

References

Educational institutions established in 1956
Public high schools in Illinois
Schools in Madison County, Illinois
1956 establishments in Illinois